Luis Miguel Angulo Sevillano (born 23 March 2004) is a Colombian footballer who currently plays as a forward for Alianza Petrolera.

Career statistics

Club

Notes

References

2004 births
Living people
Colombian footballers
Colombia youth international footballers
Association football forwards
Alianza Petrolera F.C. players
Categoría Primera A players
Sportspeople from Nariño Department